Mosapride is a gastroprokinetic agent that acts as a selective 5HT4 agonist. The major active metabolite of mosapride, known as M1, additionally acts as a 5HT3 antagonist, which accelerates gastric emptying throughout the whole of the gastrointestinal tract in humans, and is used for the treatment of gastritis, gastroesophageal reflux disease, functional dyspepsia and irritable bowel syndrome. It is recommended to be taken on an empty stomach (i.e. at least one hour before food or two hours after food).

In addition to its prokinetic properties, mosapride also exerts anti-inflammatory effects on the gastrointestinal tract which may contribute to some of its therapeutic effects. Mosapride also promotes neurogenesis in the gastrointestinal tract which may prove useful in certain bowel disorders. The neurogenesis is due to mosapride's effect on the 5-HT4 receptor where it acts as an agonist.

Its common side effects include dry mouth, abdominal pain, dizziness, headache, insomnia, malaise, nausea, diarrhea and sometimes constipation. Unlike some other prokinetic agents, mosapride has little effect on potassium channels, no effect on hERG transfected cells, and no effect on cardiovascular function that could be detected in tests on humans. Due to the pharmacokinetics of mosapride, it would take 1,000–3,000 times the therapeutic dose to elicit cardiovascular effects.

References 

Motility stimulants
Serotonin receptor agonists
Benzamides
Morpholines
Phenol ethers
Chloroarenes
Fluoroarenes